Aki–Safi was an Italian professional cycling team that existed from 1989 to 1997. From 1989 to 1993, its sponsors were Italian kitchen components manufacturer Jolly Componibili and Montenegrin beach resort Club 88.

References

External links

Cycling teams based in Italy
Defunct cycling teams based in Italy
Sports teams in Monaco
1989 establishments in Italy
1997 disestablishments in Italy
Cycling teams established in 1989
Cycling teams disestablished in 1997